Sweden competed at the 1980 Winter Paralympics in Geilo, Norway.

See also 
 Sweden at the Paralympics
 Sweden at the 1980 Winter Olympics

References 

1980
1980 in Swedish sport
Nations at the 1980 Winter Paralympics